Carlos Juan Irizarry Yunqué (June 24, 1922 – May 23, 2015) was an associate justice of the Supreme Court of Puerto Rico.  Appointed by Gov. Rafael Hernandez Colon in 1973 he was succeeded in 1985 by the Court's first female Associate Justice, Miriam Naveira.

Born on June 24, 1922 in Sabana Grande, Puerto Rico, he obtained his bachelor's degree at the University of Puerto Rico in 1943. Later he earned a juris doctor from the University of Puerto Rico School of Law in 1949. While in the University of Puerto Rico he joined Phi Sigma Alpha fraternity. Served in the United States Army between 1943 and 1946, earned the rank of Second Lieutenant in Fort Benning, Georgia. He spent eight years in public service until 1957, when he entered private practice in Ponce, Puerto Rico. From 1968 to 1973 he taught at the Pontifical Catholic University of Puerto Rico School of Law in Ponce before being appointed to the Court in 1973.

Justice Irizarry, served 12 years of service on the Court until his retirement in 1985, was a Distinguished Professor at the Interamerican University of Puerto Rico School of Law and regularly attends court activities. Judge Irizarry died on May 23, 2015 in San Juan, Puerto Rico. He was 92 years old.

Sources 

La Justicia en sus Manos by Luis Rafael Rivera, 

1922 births
2015 deaths
Associate Justices of the Supreme Court of Puerto Rico
People from Sabana Grande, Puerto Rico
Puerto Rican lawyers
University of Puerto Rico alumni
United States Army officers
20th-century Puerto Rican lawyers
Puerto Rican judges
20th-century American judges